This is list of Nepalese writers.

Nepali

Sanskrit

Limbu language

 Bairagi  Kainla
 Phalgunanda

Nepalbhasha

English

Maithili 

Dhirendra Premarshi

Hindi

 Dhooswan Sayami
 Sitaram Agrahari

Avadhi

 Vishnu Raj Atreya

Tamang 

 Bina Theeng Tamang

Chinese 
 Sulochana Manandhar

See also
 Nepali literature
 List of Nepali-language writers
 List of Nepalese poets

 
Nepali
Writers